Book of the Wyrm is a tabletop role-playing game supplement originally released by White Wolf Publishing in 1993 for their game Werewolf: The Apocalypse.

Contents
Book of the Wyrm is a sourcebook containing information on The Wyrm, foe of the Garou Nation.

Reception
The reviewer from the online second volume of Pyramid stated that "Starting with a short story entitled "Ill Winds," the book is packed full of attitude, information, and background of the Wyrm. Readers will find inside the history of not only the Black Spiral Dancers, but full tribal information as well. In addition, the corporation of Pentex is described with enough detail to choke a horse."

Alex Lucard reviewed the 20th anniversary edition for DieHard GameFan in 2014, and commented that "Book of the Wyrm is easily the best release for W20 besides the core rulebook so far, and it's also the best release by Onyx Path Publishing this year."

Reviews
Casus Belli V1 #76 (Jul-Aug 1993)
Casus Belli V1 #93 (Apr 1996)
Casus Belli V1 #94 (May 1996)
Casus Belli V1 #94 (May 1996)
Casus Belli V1 #117 (Dec 1998)

References

External links
Guide du Rôliste Galactique

Role-playing game books
Role-playing game supplements introduced in 1993
Werewolf: The Apocalypse